En Bloc is a Singaporean drama produced by Mediacorp, a local TV station.

Plot
The drama follows the Lim family and some residents of an old Tampines Grove condominium of the consequences of having their estate up for an en bloc sale for redevelopment. Every episode explores the dynamics of family relationships, the unfolding of family secrets and how they are affected and influenced by the wealth.

There are the reluctant parents, who dread the thought of leaving the home they've lived in for decades. There is the son with the troubled past, the opportunistic younger brother, the hot-headed young lawyer, the aimless youngest child, and the uneasy daughter-in-law.

Cast

Patrick Teoh as Lim Beng Teck
June Lim as Lim May Lai
Darren Lim as Andrew Lim
Nick Shen as Eric Lim
Andrea Fonseka as Cindy Lim
Nat Ho as Jude Lim
Rebecca Lim as Renee Sng

Broadcasting History
Season 1
March 5, 2008–Present
Wednesday, 8:30pm – 9:30pm

Trivia

In reality, the "Tampines Grove" condominium, the show's main setting, is a real HDB Estate Prentice in Tampines.

The filming mainly took place at Pandan Valley and Pandan Valley's Laurels supermarket

External links

http://andreafonseka.blogspot.sg/2008/04/channel-news-asia-interview-for-en-bloc.html
http://adminduties.blogspot.sg/2011/

Singaporean television series
2008 Singaporean television series debuts
Channel 5 (Singapore) original programming